Janusz Lubomir Ślązak (20 March 1907 – 24 February 1985) was a Polish rower who competed in the 1928 Summer Olympics, in the 1932 Summer Olympics, and in the 1936 Summer Olympics.

In 1928 he was part of the Polish boat which finished fourth in the eight event after being eliminated in the quarter-finals.

Four years later he won the silver medal as member of the Polish boat in the coxed pairs competition as well as the bronze medal as member of the Polish boat in the coxed fours competition.

In 1936 he was part of the Polish boat which was eliminated in the repechage of the coxed pair event.

He fought in the September Campaign of World War II.

He was born and died in Warsaw.

References

External links
 profile 

1907 births
1985 deaths
Polish male rowers
Olympic rowers of Poland
Rowers at the 1928 Summer Olympics
Rowers at the 1932 Summer Olympics
Rowers at the 1936 Summer Olympics
Olympic silver medalists for Poland
Olympic bronze medalists for Poland
Polish military personnel of World War II
Olympic medalists in rowing
Rowers from Warsaw
People from Warsaw Governorate
20th-century Polish people
Medalists at the 1932 Summer Olympics
European Rowing Championships medalists